Dommartin may refer to:

Switzerland
 Dommartin, Switzerland

France
Dommartin is the name or part of the name of several communes in France:
 Dommartin, Ain, in the Ain département
 Dommartin, Nièvre, in the Nièvre département
 Dommartin, Doubs, in the Doubs département
 Dommartin, Somme, in the Somme département
 Dommartin, Rhône, in the Rhône département
 Dommartin-aux-Bois, in the Vosges département
 Dommartin-Dampierre, in the Marne département
 Dommartin-la-Chaussée, in the Meurthe-et-Moselle département
 Dommartin-la-Montagne, in the Meuse département
 Dommartin-le-Coq, in the Aube département
 Dommartin-le-Franc, in the Haute-Marne département
 Dommartin-le-Saint-Père, in the Haute-Marne département
 Dommartin-lès-Cuiseaux, in the Saône-et-Loire département
 Dommartin-lès-Remiremont, in the Vosges département
 Dommartin-lès-Toul, in the Meurthe-et-Moselle département
 Dommartin-lès-Vallois, in the Vosges département
 Dommartin-Lettrée, in the Marne département
 Dommartin-sous-Amance, in the Meurthe-et-Moselle département
 Dommartin-sous-Hans, in the Marne département
 Dommartin-sur-Vraine, in the Vosges département
 Dommartin-Varimont, in the Marne département